The term compound fruit is not used in technical botanical writing, but is sometimes used when it is not clear which of several fruit types is involved. A compound fruit is "composed of two or more similar parts".

A compound fruit may be:
 An aggregate fruit, in which one flower contains several separate ovaries, which merge during development.
 A multiple fruit, in which several flowers, each with an ovary, develop into small fruits that are clustered or fused together into a larger fruit.
 A simple fruit formed from a compound ovary.

Grapes grow in clusters, but are not compound fruits. Each grape is grown from one ovary in one flower, and each grape remains an independent fruit.

References

Fruit morphology